Pierre Barbe (28 March 1900 – 26 April 2004) was a French architect.

Barbe became the "house architect" for the Schlumberger family. He designed Pierre Schlumberger's house on Lazy Lane in Houston, Texas. For Pierre and his first wife Claire he restored a holiday house on the Normandy coast, and designed a new house at Tourettes-sur-Loup on the Riviera.

For Pierre and his second wife São, he renovated their apartment in Sutton Place, New York, and an 18th-century hôtel particulier in the Rue Férou, Paris. From 1965 to 1975, for Pierre and Sao Schlumberger, he restored and modernised the Quinta do Vinagre, a large estate on the Portuguese coast.

References

1900 births
2004 deaths
French centenarians
Men centenarians
Architects from Paris